Chisocheton ruber is a tree in the family Meliaceae. The specific epithet  is from the Latin meaning "red", referring to the flowers.

Description
The bark is greenish grey or reddish. The sweetly scented flowers are pink to red.

Distribution and habitat
Chisocheton ruber is endemic to Borneo and known only from Sarawak.

References

ruber
Endemic flora of Borneo
Trees of Borneo
Flora of Sarawak
Plants described in 1930